Clyde Cyril Best, MBE (born 24 February 1951) is a Bermudian former football player. He was one of the first black players in First Division football in England, scoring 47 goals as a striker for West Ham United between 1968 and 1976.

Early and personal life
Best moved from Bermuda to England at the age of 17, to play for West Ham United. Upon his arrival he was looked after by club captain Bobby Moore. He has credited Moore and fellow West Ham players Harry Redknapp and Billy Bonds with helping him deal with racist abuse.

Playing career
As one of England's first black footballers, Best was regularly targeted with racist chanting from the terraces, but eventually became a fan favourite at Upton Park. He was a strong, powerful player with the skills of the traditional English centre forward, tough to dispossess when he had the ball and good in the air. He made his debut for West Ham United in a 1–1 home draw against Arsenal on 25 August 1969 at the age of 18. His first goal for the Hammers came during League Cup competition, in a 4–2 win against Halifax Town, on 3 September 1969. In 1973 Best deputised for an injured Bobby Ferguson in goal against Leeds United. Best played 218 games and registered 58 goals for West Ham over 7 seasons between August 1969 and January 1976.

Best also played in the Dutch Eredivisie for Feyenoord where he was generally viewed as a failure, scoring only 3 goals in 23 matches, and in the United States for Tampa Bay Rowdies, Toronto Blizzard and Portland Timbers of the North American Soccer League. While playing for Tampa Bay in Soccer Bowl '75, he scored an 88th-minute goal to secure the Rowdies' first NASL championship in a 2–0 victory over Portland Timbers. The following spring he led the Rowdies to the 1976 indoor title and was named tournament MVP. He was the Rowdies leading scorer for the brief 1976 indoor season with 11 goals, 5 assists for 27 points.

Managerial career
Best was an assistant coach for the San Diego Sockers for a brief period in the early 1990s. Best coached the Bermuda national team from 1997 to 1999.

Later life
After his coaching career finished he retired back to Bermuda.

Honours
Best was inducted into the Bermuda National Sports Hall of Fame in 2004. He was awarded an MBE in the 2006 New Year Honours list for services to football and the community in Bermuda.

References

External links
 
 NASL/MISL stats

1951 births
Living people
People from Sandys Parish
Association football forwards
Bermudian footballers
Bermuda international footballers
West Ham United F.C. players
Tampa Bay Rowdies (1975–1993) players
Portland Timbers (1975–1982) players
Feyenoord players
Cleveland Force (original MISL) players
Toronto Blizzard (1971–1984) players
Los Angeles Lazers players
Bermudian expatriate footballers
Bermudian expatriate sportspeople in England
Bermudian expatriate sportspeople in Canada
Bermudian expatriates in the Netherlands
Bermudian expatriate sportspeople in the United States
Expatriate footballers in the Netherlands
Expatriate soccer players in Canada
Expatriate soccer players in the United States
English Football League players
Eredivisie players
Major Indoor Soccer League (1978–1992) players
North American Soccer League (1968–1984) indoor players
North American Soccer League (1968–1984) players
Pan American Games silver medalists for Bermuda
Bermudian football managers
Bermuda national football team managers
Members of the Order of the British Empire
Pan American Games medalists in football
Footballers at the 1967 Pan American Games
Race-related controversies in the United Kingdom
Outfield association footballers who played in goal
Medalists at the 1967 Pan American Games
Bermudian people of Barbadian descent
Association football coaches